This is a bibliography of works about Halloween or in which Halloween is a prominent theme.

Novels
 John Bellairs, The House with a Clock in Its Walls
 Jim Butcher, Dead Beat
 Ray Bradbury, Something Wicked This Way Comes (1962)
 Ray Bradbury, The Halloween Tree (1972)
 Agatha Christie, Hallowe'en Party
 Franklin W. Dixon, Dead of Night, #80 in The Hardy Boys' Casefiles
 Franklin W. Dixon, Trick-or-Trouble, #175 in The Hardy Boys Mystery Stories
 Daniel Handler, The Basic Eight
 Ed McBain, Tricks: An 87th Precinct Novel
 Norman Partridge, Dark Harvest
 R.L. Stine, The Haunted Mask
 R.L. Stine, Attack of the Jack O'Lanterns
 R.L. Stine, Fear Street: Halloween Party
 Margaret Sutton, The Haunted Attic, #2 in the Judy Bolton Mystery series
 James Tipper, Gods of The Nowhere: A Novel of Halloween
 Halloween by Curtis Richards (a pseudonym of author Dennis Etchison), a novelization of the 1978 film. This novel has been out of print since the 1980s.
 Halloween II by Jack Martin (a pseudonym of author Dennis Etchison), a novelization of the 1981 film.
 Halloween III: Season of the Witch by Jack Martin (a pseudonym of author Dennis Etchison), a novelization of the 1982 film.
 Halloween IV by Nicholas Grabowsky, a novelization of the film Halloween 4: The Return of Michael Myers.
 Five Black Cats by Pat Hegarty

Short stories
 Philarète Chasles, "The Eye with No Lid"

Anthologies
 Isaac Asimov (editor), Thirteen Horrors of Halloween
 Lesley Pratt Bannatyne (editor), A Halloween Reader: Poems, Stories, and Plays from Halloween Past
 Ray Bradbury (author), The October Country
 Ray Bradbury (author), From Dust Returned
 Richard Chizmar (editor), Trick or Treat: A Collection of Halloween Novellas
 Richard Chizmar and Robert Morrish (editors), October Dreams: A Celebration of Halloween
 Paula Guran (editor), Halloween
 Paula Guran (editor), Halloween: Magic, Mystery, and the Macabre
 Marvin Kaye (editor), The Ultimate Halloween
 Ronald Kelly (author), The Halloween Store and Other Tales of All Hallows' Eve
 Ronald Kelly (author), Mister Glow-Bones and Other Halloween Tales
 Lisa Morton (editor), A Hallowe'en Anthology: Literary and Historical Writers over the Centuries
 Norman Partridge (author), Halloween: Tales of the Dark Season
 Alan Ryan (editor), Halloween Horrors
 Al Sarrantonio (author), Halloween and Other Seasons
 J. Tonzelli (author), The End of Summer: Thirteen Tales of Halloween

Children's books
 Adrienne Adams, A Halloween Happening
 Adrienne Adams, A Woggle of Witches
 Frank Asch, Popcorn
 Lesley Bannatyne, Witches' Night Before Halloween
 Harry Behn, Halloween
 Norman Bridwell, Clifford's Halloween
 Robert Bright, Georgie's Halloween
 Eve Bunting, In the Haunted House
 Eve Bunting, Scary, Scary Halloween
 Nancy L. Carson, Harriet's Halloween Candy
 Patricia Coombs, Dorrie and the Halloween Plot
 Paulette Cooper, Let's Find Out About Halloween
 Margery Cuyler, The Bumpy Little Pumpkin
 Gail Gibbons, Halloween Is...
 Rumer Godden, Mr. McFadden's Hallowe'en
 James Howe, Scared Silly: A Halloween Treat
 Will Hubbell, Pumpkin Jack
 Ulrich Karger, The Scary Sleepover
 Carolyn Keene, Nancy Drew and the Clue Crew: The Halloween Hoax
 Kazuno Kohara, Ghosts in the House!
 Robert Kraus, How Spider Saved Halloween
 Elizabeth Levy, Something Queer at the Haunted School
 Eve Merriam, Halloween ABC
 Herman Parish, Happy Haunting, Amelia Bedelia
 Gary Paulsen, Dunc's Halloween
 Robert Newton Peck, Higbee's Halloween
 Jack Prelutsky, It's Halloween
 Jack Prelutsky, Nightmares: Poems to Trouble Your Sleep
 Jack Prelutsky, The Headless Horseman Rides Tonight: More Poems to Trouble Your Sleep
 Alvin Schwartz, Scary Stories to Tell in the Dark
 J. Otto Seibold, Vunce Upon a Time
 Jerry Seinfeld, Halloween
 Erica Silverman, Big Pumpkin
 Erica Silverman, The Halloween House
 Fran Cannon Slayton, When the Whistle Blows
 Louis Slobodkin, Trick or Treat
 Jerry Smath, I Like Pumpkins
 James Stevenson, That Terrible Halloween Night
 Geronimo Stilton, It's Halloween, You 'Fraidy Mouse!
 Jill Thompson, Scary Godmother
 Tasha Tudor, Pumpkin Moonshine
 Nora S. Unwin, Proud Pumpkin
 Nora S. Unwin, Two Too Many
 Dan Yaccarino, Five Little Pumpkins

Non-fiction
 Diane C. Arkins, Halloween: Romantic Art and Customs of Yesteryear. Gretna, LA: Pelican Publishing Company (2000). 96 pages. 
 Diane C. Arkins, Halloween Merrymaking: An Illustrated Celebration of Fun, Food, and Frolics from Halloweens Past. Gretna, LA: Pelican Publishing Company (2004). 112 pages. 
 Lesley Bannatyne, Halloween: An American Holiday, An American History. New York: Facts on File (1990). 176 pages. ; Halloween Nation. Behind the Scenes of America's Fright Night. Gretna, LA: Pelican Publishing Company (2011). 248 pages. 
 Edna Barth, Witches, Pumpkins, and Grinning Ghosts: The Story of the Halloween Symbols. New York: Seabury Press (1972). 95 pages. 
 Phyllis Galembo, Dressed for Thrills: 100 Years of Halloween Costumes and Masquerade. New York: Harry N. Abrams, Inc. (2002). 128 pages. 
 Lint Hatcher, The Magic Eightball Test: A Christian Defense of Halloween and All Things Spooky. Lulu.com (2006). 
 Ronald Hutton, The Stations of the Sun: A History of the Ritual Year in Britain. Oxford Paperbacks (2001). 560 pages. 
 Ruth Edna Kelley, The Book of Hallowe'en. BiblioLife (2009, reprint ed., orig. 1919). 140 pages. 
 Jean Markale, The Pagan Mysteries of Halloween: Celebrating the Dark Half of the Year (translation of Halloween, histoire et traditions). Rochester, VT: Inner Traditions (2001). 160 pages. 
 Lisa Morton, The Halloween Encyclopedia. Jefferson, NC: McFarland & Company (2003). 240 pages. 
 Lisa Morton, Trick or Treat: A History of Halloween. London: Reaktion Books (2012). 229 pages. 
 Nicholas Rogers, Halloween: From Pagan Ritual to Party Night. New York: Oxford University Press (2002). 198 pages. 
 Jack Santino (ed.), Halloween and Other Festivals of Death and Life. Knoxville, TN: University of Tennessee Press (1994). 280 pages. ;
 The Hallowed Eve: Dimensions of Culture in a Calendar Festival in Northern Ireland. Lexington, KY: University of Kentucky (2009). 180 pages. 
 David J. Skal, Death Makes a Holiday: A Cultural History of Halloween. New York: Bloomsbury USA (2003). 224 pages. 
 Ben Truwe, The Halloween Catalog Collection. Portland, OR: Talky Tina Press (2003). 

Literature lists
 
Religious bibliographies
American literature-related lists